Leander Babcock (March 1, 1811 – August 18, 1864) was an American lawyer and politician who served one term as a Democratic United States Representative for the 23rd district of New York from 1851 to 1853.

Biography
Babcock was born in Paris, New York in 1811. He first attended Hamilton College and then transferred to Union College where he was a member of The Kappa Alpha Society and was elected to Phi Beta Kappa, and graduated in 1830. He studied law at Union College and was admitted to the New York bar in 1834.

Career
Babcock moved to Oswego, New York where he practiced law. From 1840 to 1843, he served as the district attorney for Oswego County. He then became mayor of Oswego.

Elected to the 32nd United States Congress, Babcock served from March 4, 1851 to March 3, 1853.  After his term in office, he returned to Oswego and served as president of its board of education in 1855 and as an alderman from 1856 to 1858.

Death
Babcock died in Richfield Springs, New York on August 18, 1864 (age 53 years, 170 days). He is interred at Riverside Cemetery in Oswego, New York.

References

External links

1811 births
1864 deaths
Union College (New York) alumni
Democratic Party members of the United States House of Representatives from New York (state)
People from Paris, New York
Politicians from Oswego, New York
People from Richfield Springs, New York
19th-century American politicians
Oswego County District Attorneys
Members of the United States House of Representatives from New York (state)